Esch-sur-Alzette railway station is a railway station serving Esch-sur-Alzette, in south-western Luxembourg. It is operated by Chemins de Fer Luxembourgeois (CFL), the state-owned railway company. CFL general refer to the station as Esch/Alzette as shown on the sign.

The station is situated on Line 60, which connects Luxembourg City to the Red Lands of the south of the country.  After Esch-sur-Alzette, the main line continues towards Niederkorn, whilst a minor line branches off to Audun-le-Tiche, in France.

External links

 Official CFL page on Esch-sur-Alzette station
 Rail.lu page on Esch-sur-Alzette station

Railway stations in Esch-sur-Alzette
Railway stations on CFL Line 60